The 48 Hour Film Project is an annual film competition in which teams of filmmakers are assigned a genre, a character, a prop, and a line of dialogue, and have 48 hours to create a short film containing those elements. The competition has been active since 2001. 

In the weeks after the 48 hours of filmmaking are complete, screenings are held in each city and a winner is chosen to represent that city at Filmapalooza—a festival that features "best of" screenings of the winners from each city. Filmapalooza is hosted by a different city each year. The most recent Filmapalooza, in 2020, was held in Rotterdam, Netherlands.

Background 
The competition began in Washington, D.C., in 2001.  It was created by Mark Ruppert and is produced by Ruppert and Liz Langston. In 2009, nearly 40,000 filmmakers made around 3,000 films in 76 cities across the globe.

After the 48 hours of filmmaking are complete, each city screens all the competing films, and a jury subsequently vote on the 1st, 2nd, and 3rd best films. Most cities also give out awards to their films in several categories, including directing, writing, and acting; an Audience Choice award is sometimes voted on as well, by the audience of the screenings in each city.

The film that wins 1st place goes on to represent their city at Filmapalooza—a festival that features "best of" screenings of the winners from each city. Filmapalooza is hosted by a different city each year. The most recent Filmapalooza, in 2020, was held in Rotterdam, Netherlands.

Related competitions

In 2003, the creators of the 48 Hour Film Project created the National Film Challenge, which is an annual three-day film competition with roughly the same structure as the 48 Hour Film Project, except that the films are mailed in when completed and then screened on-line, rather than being shown in movie theater in the local city. 

In 2008, this competition was opened to filmmakers from around the world and although the name was not officially changed, the runner-up hailed from Utrecht, Netherlands. 

The organizers of the Auckland competition split off from the 48 Hour Film Project after the 2003 competition and formed 48HOURS, which is now a wholly separate organization that runs a similar competition in New Zealand.

In 2006, the producers of the National Film Challenge began the International Documentary Challenge (also known as the "Doc Challenge") in which participating filmmakers produce a documentary in under five days.

In 2011, 48 Go Green split off from 48 Hour Film Project to become a separate, independent organization. 48 Go Green had a similar style of competition. The primary differences were an ecological theme, and an entirely online competition to allow worldwide participation. 48 Go Green and 48 Hour Film Project parted ways following a disagreement between 48 Hour Film Project and co-producers Francesco Vitali and Christos Siametis. 48 Go Green soon became 48FILM Project.

List of participating locations
All cities listed below have participated every year since their introduction, unless otherwise noted.

Starting in 2001
 Washington, District of Columbia

Starting in 2002
 Atlanta, Georgia
 Austin, Texas
 Los Angeles, California
 New York City, New York
 Philadelphia, Pennsylvania

Starting in 2003
 Auckland, New Zealand (2003 only; became 48HOURS)
 Boston, Massachusetts
 Cincinnati, Ohio
 Nashville, Tennessee
 San Francisco, California

Starting in 2004
 Brisbane, Australia (did not participate in 2011)
 Greensboro, North Carolina
 London, England (did not participate from 2005-2007)
 Minneapolis, Minnesota
 Portland, Oregon
 San Diego, California
 Sheffield, England (2004 only)
 St. Louis, Missouri

Starting in 2005
 Aberdeen, South Dakota (2005 only)
 Asheville, North Carolina
 Baltimore, Maryland
 Black Rock City, Nevada
 Chicago, Illinois
 Denver, Colorado
 Des Moines, Iowa
 Houston, Texas
 Las Vegas, Nevada
 Little Rock, Arkansas
 Miami, Florida
 Paris, France
 Phoenix, Arizona (until 2008)
 Seattle, Washington

Starting in 2006
 Albuquerque, New Mexico
 Fargo, North Dakota (did not participate in 2010)
 Louisville, Kentucky
 Portland, Maine
 Providence, Rhode Island

Starting in 2007
 Amsterdam, Netherlands
 Berlin, Germany (did not participate in 2010)
 Buffalo, New York
 Cleveland, Ohio
 Dallas, Texas
 Ghent, Belgium (2007 only)
 Hampton Roads
 Honolulu, Hawaii (until 2008)
 Indianapolis, Indiana
 Jacksonville, Florida
 Madison, Wisconsin
 Machinima
 Milwaukee, Wisconsin
 New Orleans, Louisiana
 Pittsburgh, Pennsylvania
 Richmond, Virginia
 Rome, Italy
 Salt Lake City, Utah
 San Antonio, Texas
 San Jose, California
 Tampa-St. Petersburg, Florida
 Tel Aviv, Israel
 Utrecht, Netherlands

Starting in 2008
 Athens, Greece (until 2010)
 Columbus, Ohio
 Detroit, Michigan
 Edinburgh, Scotland
 Finland (2008 only)
 Geneva, Switzerland (did not participate in 2010)
 Inland Empire, California
 Kansas City, Missouri
 Melbourne, Australia
 Mumbai, India
 Orlando, Florida
 Singapore
 Sydney, Australia
 Toronto, Ontario

Starting in 2009
 Antwerp, Belgium (2009 only)
 Beijing, China
 Breda, Netherlands (until 2011)
 Haifa, Israel (until 2010)
 Hong Kong, China (until 2010)
 Jerusalem (until 2010)
 Lisbon, Portugal
 New Hampshire
 Paducah, Kentucky
 Savannah, Georgia
 Seoul, South Korea (did not participate in 2011)

Starting in 2010
 Granada, Spain
 Ho Chi Minh City, Vietnam
 Johannesburg, South Africa
 Kuala Lumpur, Malaysia
 Ulan Bator, Mongolia
 Newcastle upon Tyne, England (2010 only)
 Nijmegen, Netherlands
 Tirana, Albania

Starting in 2011
 Barcelona, Spain
 Beirut, Lebanon
 Brașov, Romania
 Delhi, India
 Dijon, France
 Dubai, United Arab Emirates
 Glasgow, Scotland
 Hanoi, Vietnam
 Kaohsiung, Taiwan
 Mexico City, Mexico (2011 only)
 New Haven, Connecticut
 Oklahoma City, Oklahoma
 Osaka, Japan
 Prague, Czech Republic
 São Paulo, Brazil (2011 only)
 Seville, Spain
 Shanghai, China
 Warsaw, Poland
 Prague, Czech Republic

Starting in 2012
 Amman, Jordan
 Brussels, Belgium
 Cairo, Egypt
 Cape Town, South Africa
 Dundee, Scotland
 Hyderabad, India
 İstanbul, Turkey
 Jackson, Mississippi
 Kraków, Poland
 Lyon, France
 Madrid, Spain
 Málaga, Spain
 Memphis, Tennessee
 Montreal, Quebec
 Renens, Switzerland
 Rotterdam, Netherlands
 Vilnius, Lithuania

Starting in 2014
Willemstad, Curaçao
Castelo Branco, Portugal
Charlotte, North Carolina
Montpellier, France
Tunis, Tunisie
The competition organizers maintain records online that indicate which cities have participated in past years.

Awards

In each participating city, one participant is chosen as the City Winner and their film is submitted to a jury for consideration against other City Winners for the competition year. The jury's selection from among these films is named the year's winner and is honored at Filmapalooza, the finale festival for the 48 Hour Film Project.

See also
List of film festivals
Photomarathon

References

External links
48 Hour Film Project Official Site

Film festivals held in multiple countries
Film competitions
Short film festivals